Makariv Raion was a raion (district) in Kyiv Oblast of Ukraine. Its administrative center was the urban-type settlement of Makariv. The raion was abolished on 18 July 2020 as part of the administrative reform of Ukraine, which reduced the number of raions of Kyiv Oblast to seven. The area of Makariv Raion was split between Bucha and Fastiv Raions.

At the time of disestablishment, the raion consisted of two hromadas, 
 Byshiv rural hromada  with the administration in the selo of Byshiv, transferred to Fastiv Raion;
 Makariv settlement hromada with the administration in Makariv, transferred to Bucha Raion;

References

Former raions of Kyiv Oblast
1923 establishments in Ukraine
Ukrainian raions abolished during the 2020 administrative reform